Fire Station No. 1, and variations, may refer to:

in Australia
No. 1 Fire Station (Perth, Western Australia), a historic fire station in Australia

in the United States
Fayetteville Fire Department Fire Station 1, Fayetteville, Arkansas, listed on the National Register of Historic Places (NRHP)
 Fire Station No. 1 (Los Angeles, California), List of Los Angeles Historic-Cultural Monuments on the East and Northeast Sides
Santa Ana Fire Station Headquarters No. 1, Santa Ana, California, NRHP-listed
Engine Company 1 Fire Station, Hartford, Connecticut, NRHP-listed
 Fire Station No. 1 (Denver, Colorado), NRHP-listed
Engine Company Number One (Augusta, Georgia), NRHP-listed
 Fire Station No. 1 (Muncie, Indiana), NRHP-listed
Des Moines Fire Department Headquarters' Fire Station No. 1 and Shop Building, Des Moines, Iowa, NRHP-listed
Fire House No. 1 (Duluth, Minnesota), NRHP-listed, also known as "Engine House No. 1"
 Pascagoula Central Fire Station No. 1, Pascagoula, Mississippi, NRHP-listed
Engine Company No. 1 and No. 30, Pittsburgh, Pennsylvania
Fire Museum of Memphis, in former Fire Engine House No. 1, Memphis, Tennessee
Fire Hall No. 1 (Nashville, Tennessee), NRHP-listed, also known as the "George W. Swint Sr. Engine Company No. 1" and as ""Germantown Fire Hall"
 Fire Station No. 1 (Roanoke, Virginia), NRHP-listed
 Fire Station No. 1 (Tacoma, Washington), NRHP-listed

See also
List of fire stations